The Haepyeong Gil clan is a Korean clan. Their bon-gwan is in Gumi, North Gyeongsang Province. According to research conducted in 2015, there were 35,823 members of the Haepyeong Gil clan.

See also 
 Korean clan names of foreign origin

References

External links 
 

 
Gil clans
Korean clan names of Chinese origin